Mississippi Highway 314 (MS 314) is a state highway in Lafayette County, serving the city of Oxford. It is generally a two-lane roadway.

The road begins northwest of Oxford and travels southeast towards the city and the campus of the University of Mississippi before traveling through the city's downtown area. The highway ends at an interchange with MS 7 where the road continues as MS 334.

Route description
The western terminus of MS 314 is in rural Lafayette County northwest of Oxford. West of here, the roadway continues as Lafayette County Road 100 heading towards the Sardis Reservoir. MS 314 heads southeast as a two-lane road past churches and a sports field complex. Passing through a roundabout, the road gains bike lanes on both sides of the highway as it passes small condominiums and the University-Oxford Airport as it enters the city limits of Oxford. MS 314 makes a sharp curve to the south to come to an intersection with Jackson Avenue, former MS  6, across the road from the University of Mississippi campus. MS 314 becomes four lanes wide with a center turn lane as it skirts around the north side of the college campus heading east. The road narrows to two lanes and passes under the Oxford Depot Trail (formerly Mississippi Central Railroad), MS 314 turns to the south along Ninth Avenue before Jackson Avenue reaches the downtown portion of Oxford. It heads south for three blocks before turning back to the east on University Avenue. Heading through the city's business district, MS 314 widens to four lanes before it ends at a diamond interchange with MS 7. University Avenue continues east as MS 334 which also has its terminus at this interchange.

MS 314 is state-maintained on its portion west of Oxford city limits and in the vicinity of the MS 7 interchange. It is otherwise maintained by the city of Oxford.

History
The highway was established as an unpaved road around 1957 running from the Sardis Reservoir into Oxford. By 1994, most of the road had been paved.

Major intersections

References

External links

314
Transportation in Lafayette County, Mississippi